Baucis (minor planet designation: 172 Baucis) is a large main belt asteroid that was discovered by French astronomer Alphonse Borrelly on February 5, 1877, and named after a fictional character in the Greek legend of Baucis and Philemon. The adjectival form of the name is Baucidian. It is classified as an S-type asteroid based upon its spectrum.

Photometric observations of this asteroid from the southern hemisphere during 2003 gave a light curve that indicated a slow synodic rotation period of 27.417 ± 0.013 hours and a brightness variation of 0.25 in magnitude.

Polarimetric study of this asteroid reveals anomalous properties that suggests the regolith consists of a mixture of low and high albedo material. This may have been caused by fragmentation of an asteroid substrate with the spectral properties of CO3/CV3 carbonaceous chondrites.

References

External links
 
 

Background asteroids
Baucis
Baucis
S-type asteroids (Tholen)
L-type asteroids (SMASS)
18770205